Amata lampetis is a species of moth of the family Erebidae first described by Alfred Jefferis Turner in 1898. It is found in Australia.

References 

lampetis
Moths described in 1898
Moths of Australia